Linda strbai is a species of beetle in the family Cerambycidae. It was described by Viktora and Lin in 2014. It is known from Malaysia.

References

strbai
Beetles described in 2014